Voyage is a 3-CD box set by David Crosby. It features highlights from his career as a solo artist and with groups including The Byrds, various permutations of CSN&Y, and CPR.  The tracks are arranged in general chronological order of release.  One full disc is devoted to previously unreleased material, mainly acoustic demos.

The album was compiled by Graham Nash, who also compiled box sets for himself and for Stephen Stills. It was later reissued as The David Crosby Box with seven tracks removed from Disc 1 (1-3 and 17-20) due to licensing issues.

Track listing
Disc One: Essential Vol. 1
"Eight Miles High" (Clark/McGuinn/Crosby) — The Byrds
"Renaissance Fair" (Crosby/McGuinn) — The Byrds
"Everybody's Been Burned" (Crosby) — The Byrds
"Wooden Ships" (Crosby/Kantner/Stills) — Crosby, Stills & Nash
"Guinnevere" (Crosby) — Crosby, Stills & Nash
"Long Time Gone" (Crosby) — Crosby, Stills & Nash
"Déjà Vu" (Crosby) — Crosby, Stills, Nash & Young
"Almost Cut My Hair" (Crosby) — Crosby, Stills, Nash & Young
"Tamalpais High (At About 3)" (Crosby) — David Crosby
"Laughing" (Crosby) — David Crosby
"Music Is Love" (Crosby/Nash/Young) — David Crosby
"Song with No Words (Tree with No Leaves)" (Crosby) — David Crosby
"What Are Their Names?" (Crosby/Garcia/Lesh/Shrieve/Young) — David Crosby
"I'd Swear There Was Somebody Here" (Crosby) — David Crosby
"Where Will I Be" (Crosby) — Crosby & Nash
"Page 43" (Crosby) — Crosby & Nash
"Critical Mass" (Crosby) — Crosby & Nash
"Carry Me" (Crosby) — Crosby & Nash
"Bittersweet" (Crosby) — Crosby & Nash
"Naked in the Rain" (Crosby/Nash) — Crosby & Nash
"Dancer" (Crosby) - Crosby & Nash

Disc Two: Essential Vol. 2
"Shadow Captain" (Crosby/Doerge) — Crosby, Stills & Nash
"In My Dreams" (Crosby) — Crosby, Stills & Nash
"Delta" (Crosby) — Crosby, Stills & Nash
"Compass" (Crosby) — Crosby, Stills, Nash & Young
"Tracks in the Dust" (Crosby) — David Crosby
"Arrows" (Hedges/Crosby) — Crosby, Stills & Nash
"Hero" (Collins/Crosby) — David Crosby
"Yvette in English" (Mitchell/Crosby) — David Crosby
"Rusty and Blue" (Crosby) — CPR
"Somehow She Knew" (Crosby) — CPR
"Breathless" (Crosby/Crosby/Pevar/Raymond/Ford/DiStanislao) — CPR
"Map to Buried Treasure" (Crosby/Crosby/Pevar/Raymond/Ford/DiStanislao) — CPR
"At the Edge" (Crosby/Pevar/Raymond) — CPR
"Through Here Quite Often" (Crosby/Parks) — Crosby & Nash
"My Country 'Tis of Thee" (Smith/trad., arr. Hedges) — David Crosby

Disc Three — Buried Treasure (All Previously Unissued)
"Long Time Gone" (Demo) (Crosby) — Crosby & Stills
"Guinnevere" (Alternate Mix) (Crosby) — David Crosby
"Almost Cut My Hair" (Demo) (Crosby) — David Crosby
"Games" (Demo) (Crosby) — David Crosby
"Déjà Vu" (Demo) (Crosby) — Crosby & Nash
"Triad" (Demo) (Crosby) — David Crosby
"Cowboy Movie" (Studio Version) (Crosby) — David Crosby
"Kids and Dogs" (Unissued Song) (Crosby) — David Crosby
"Have You Seen the Stars Tonight?" (Alternate Mix) (Kantner/Crosby) — Paul Kantner/Jefferson Starship
"The Lee Shore" (Live at Carnegie Hall, 1971) (Crosby) — Crosby & Nash
"Traction in the Rain" (Live at Carnegie Hall, 1971) (Crosby) — Crosby & Nash
"King of the Mountain" (Demo) (Crosby) — David Crosby
"Homeward Through the Haze" (Alternate Mix) (Crosby) — Crosby, Stills, Nash & Young
"Samurai" (Studio Version) (Crosby) — David Crosby
"Climber" (Studio Version) (Crosby) — Crosby, Stills, Nash & Young
"Dream for Him" (live in Columbus, OH, 2002) (Crosby) — Crosby, Stills, Nash & Young

References

David Crosby compilation albums
2006 compilation albums
Rhino Records compilation albums